General Sir Hugh Henry Gough  (14 November 1833 – 12 May 1909) was a senior British Indian Army officer and a recipient of the Victoria Cross, the highest award for gallantry in the face of the enemy that can be awarded to British and Commonwealth forces.

Early life

Gough was born into a family of Anglo-Irish gentry in Calcutta, Bengal, India, on 14 November 1833. He was commissioned ensign in the 3rd Bengal Light Cavalry in September 1853 aged 19, and was still serving with the Indian Army on the outbreak of the First Indian war of independence  in 1857.

Victoria Cross
Gough was 23 years old, and a lieutenant in the 1st Bengal European Light Cavalry (later 19th Hussars) during the First war of Indian independence, when the following deeds took place for which he was awarded the VC:

Later career
Gough commanded the 12th Bengal Cavalry in the 1868 Abyssinian expedition, and was appointed a Companion of the Order of the Bath in August 1868. He served under General Frederick Roberts during the Second Anglo-Afghan War, including the battles of Peiwar Kotal in December 1878 and Charasia in October 1879. He also commanded the cavalry brigade on Roberts' march from Kabul to Kandahar in August 1880, and the Battle of Kandahar on 1 September 1880. He was made a Knight Commander of the Order of the Bath in 1881.

After a number of senior military posts in India, Gough achieved the rank of general in 1894. He was made a Knight Grand Cross of the Order of the Bath in 1896, before retiring a year later. He was then appointed Keeper of the Jewel House at the Tower of London, dying while still holding this office on 12 May 1909. He was buried at Kensal Green Cemetery.

Family
General Gough was the third son of Judge George Gough and Charlotte Margaret Becher. He was brother to General Sir Charles Gough, and uncle of the senior First World War commanders General Sir Hubert Gough and Brigadier General Sir John Gough. He was the grandnephew of Field Marshal The 1st Viscount Gough.

Gough married Anne Margaret Hill on 8 September 1863 and they had five sons and four daughters. These included Charlotte Elise Gough (died 17 August 1942), who married Lieutenant General Sir Henry Wilson, by whom she had three children:
Captain Arthur Henry Maitland Wilson, 12th Cavalry, b 22 January 1885, accidentally killed in Khaniken, Mesopotamia 29 January 1918.
Hugh Maitland Wilson, 6 April 1886.
Muriel Maitland Wilson, died unmarried 25 June 1950.

Works
 Old Memories. Cornell University Library (1 January 1897)

Notes

References
Irish Winners of the Victoria Cross (Richard Doherty & David Truesdale, 2000)
Monuments to Courage (David Harvey, 1999)
The Register of the Victoria Cross (This England, 1997)

External links
Location of grave and VC medal (Kensal Green Cemetery)
Biography

1833 births
1909 deaths
Military personnel of British India
Military personnel from Kolkata
Indian Rebellion of 1857 recipients of the Victoria Cross
Knights Grand Cross of the Order of the Bath
Burials at Kensal Green Cemetery
British East India Company Army officers
British military personnel of the Abyssinian War
British military personnel of the Second Anglo-Afghan War
British Indian Army generals
19th Royal Hussars officers
Bengal Staff Corps officers
Irish recipients of the Victoria Cross
Masters of the Jewel Office